The 2011 FIM Dansk Metal Nordic Speedway Grand Prix was the ninth race of the 2011 Speedway Grand Prix season. It took place on September 10 at the Speedway Center stadium in Vojens, Denmark.

Riders 
The Speedway Grand Prix Commission nominated Bjarne Pedersen as Wild Card, and Michael Jepsen Jensen and Mikkel Michelsen both as Track Reserves. The Draw was made on September 9.

Results 
Grand Prix was won by Grag Hancock who beat Jason Crump, Fredrik Lindgren and Chris Harris in the final.

Heat details

Heat after heat 
 (59,54) Lindbäck, Jonsson, Gollob, Holta (F)
 (59,23) Hancock, Sayfutdinov, B. Pedersen, N. Pedersen (X)
 (59,39) Bjerre, Hampel, Łaguta, Harris
 (59,91) Holder, Lindgren, Crump, Kołodziej
 (60,72) Hancock, Holder, Łaguta, Gollob
 (58,89) Jonsson, Sayfutdinov, Harris, Kołodziej
 (60,28) N. Pedersen, Lindgren, Bjerre, Holta
 (60,53) Hampel, Crump, Lindbäck, B. Pedersen
 (60,16) Bjerre, Crump, Sayfutdinov, Gollob
 (60,07) Hampel, Jonsson, Hancock, Lindgren
 (60,59) Łaguta, B. Pedersen, Holta, Kołodziej
 (60,88) N. Pedersen, Lindbäck, Holder, Harris
 (60,92) Gollob, N. Pedersen, Kołodziej, Hampel
 (60,84) Bjerre, Holder, Jonsson, B. Pedersen
 (60,63) Hancock, Crump, Harris, Holta
 (60,85) Lindgren, Łaguta, Sayfutdinov, Lindbäck
 (61,07) Harris, Lindgren, Gollob, B. Pedersen
 (61,17) Crump, Łaguta, N. Pedersen, Jonsson
 (61,03) Sayfutdinov, Holta, Holder, Hampel
 (60,91) Hancock, Bjerre, Kołodziej, Lindbäck
 Semi-finals:
 (61,10) Hancock, Holder, N. Pedersen, Sayfutdinov
 (61,13) Crump, Lindgren, Bjerre, Łaguta 
 the Final:
 (61,04) Hancock (6 points), Crump (4), Lindgren (2), Holder (0)

The intermediate classification

See also 
 motorcycle speedway

References 

Speedway Grand Prix of Nordic
Nordic
2011